Porahat is a village in West Singhbhum district of Jharkhand state in eastern India. Before Indian independence in 1947, it was the capital of a princely state of British India. Porahat Forest Division is named after this village.

Forest divisions in West Singhbum are:
 Saranda Forest Division
 Kolhan Forest Division
 Porahat Forest Division
 Chaibasa (South) Forest Division

Cities and towns in West Singhbhum district